Skeletophyllon kalisi is a moth in the family Cossidae. It was described by Roepke in 1957. It is found on Sulawesi.

References

Natural History Museum Lepidoptera generic names catalog

Zeuzerinae
Moths described in 1957